Mohammad Hasnain (born 20 October 1975) is a Pakistani cricketer. He played 50 first-class, 39 List A and 4 Twenty20 matches between 1991 and 2009, principally representing Karachi teams; he also played for Karachi Port Trust and Hyderabad. He also represented Pakistan in three under-19 One Day International matches.

References

External links
 

1975 births
Living people
Pakistani cricketers
Karachi cricketers
Karachi Port Trust cricketers
Hyderabad (Pakistan) cricketers
Cricketers from Karachi